is one of the 10 wards in Sapporo, Hokkaidō, Japan. It is  translated as "pure" or "clean" for "清", and "(rice) field" for "田". The ward was split from Toyohira-ku on November 4, 1997.

Overview 
According to the jūminhyō (registry of residential addresses and figures) in 2008, 114,730 people are living in Kiyota-ku. The total area of the ward is 59.70 km², which is the 4th largest ward in Sapporo.

The ward is neighboured to four wards in Sapporo (Toyohira-ku, Shiroishi-ku, Atsubetsu-ku, Minami-ku), and two cities (Kitahiroshima, Eniwa) .

History 
The central part of Kiyota-ku was originally called as "Ashiribetsu", and in 1944, it was renamed as Kiyota, meaning "beautiful pure (clean) rice field". Rice fields and farms of the apples have widely spread in the area until early Shōwa period, but the area did not exist as one of the wards in Sapporo.

In 1972, Sapporo was listed as one of the cities designated by government ordinance, and several wards were established including Toyohira-ku. On November 4, 1997, Kiyota-ku was split from Toyohira-ku, and the Kiyota-ku Residential Center with a hall for cultural purposes was built in following year.

Education

University
 Sapporo International University

College
 Sapporo International University Junior College

High schools

Public
 Hokkaido Sapporo Shinei High School
 Hokkaido Sapporo Hiraoka High School
 Hokkaido Sapporo Kiyota High School (city)

Private
 Hokurei High School
 Hokkaido Korean Primary, Middle and High School (North Korean international school)

Transportation
Kiyota-ku is the only ward of Sapporo in which there is no railway.
 Hokkaido Expressway: Sapporo-minami IC
 Route 36

Mascot 

The hat was actually the ward symbol. The leaf on his shirt symbolizes nature (this gives him the ability to turn into a leaf himself to give positive energy to people he trusted and take away the bad ones while protecting them from danger. He loves to eat spinach served with sweets and water. His birthday is November 4. His role model is Shigeharu Nagaoka (who revolutionize rice farming in the area) inspired him to grow rice and other stuff that can develop the ward.

Sources

External links 

 Kiyota Fan Club - Kiyota-ku official homepage 

Wards of Sapporo